C. Richard Kamin (born July 8, 1944) is an American politician who served in the New Jersey General Assembly from 1986 to 1994.

References

External links

|-

1944 births
Living people
Republican Party members of the New Jersey General Assembly